Bongkosh Ngamsom Rittichainuwat is a Thai researcher, scholar, professor and academic administrator. She is currently Dean & Professor of the international College of Hospitality & Tourism Management at Siam University. She is also the board member of Asia Pacific Council on Hotel, Restaurant, and Institutional Education .

Books
Special Interest Tourism, 3rd Edition
Exhibition Manual
Convention 101

References

External links
 

Living people
Year of birth missing (living people)
Bongkosh Rittichainuwat
People in tourism
Bongkosh Rittichainuwat
Bongkosh Rittichainuwat
Oklahoma State University alumni